Gonzalo Baz (born 1985) is an Uruguayan writer and publisher. He was born in Montevideo. He runs the publishing house Pez en el Hielo and is a member of the Sancocho collective of independent artists and publishers. He has published two works of fiction till date: 
 Animales que vuelven (Returning animals, Pez en el Hielo), winner of the 2018 Ópera Prima Award from the Uruguayan Ministry of Education
 Los pasajes comunes (The common passages, Criatura Editora, 2020), his debut novel 

Baz is also a translator of Brazilian literature into Spanish. In 2021, he was named by Granta magazine as one of the best young writers in the Spanish language.

References

Uruguayan writers
Living people
1985 births